Edinburgh City Mission is a Christian charitable organisation whose aim is to share the Gospel of Jesus Christ in words and action, and engage in poverty relief among the inhabitants of Edinburgh and the surrounding area, particularly in deprived communities.

The Mission's flagship program is a network of nine partner church-based Foodbanks+ throughout Edinburgh and the surrounding area. The Foodbanks+ provide resources for people who are struggling to afford basic necessities, provide relational support and sign-posting to other services.

In the summer of 2017, the Trustees appointed Duncan Cuthill as its new CEO. Since then, new areas of work have been initiated, such as the establishment of two partner Soul Food meals, Salaam support work for refugees and asylum seekers, The Storehouse food storage and distribution centre in Sighthill, and a Clothesbank+.

Edinburgh City Mission helped found the Care Van in association with Bethany Christian Trust in 1990 and continues to partner with Bethany with its management. Forty Edinburgh churches provide volunteer teams to run the Care Van 363 evenings a year, and other volunteers run it 250 lunch-times a year.

History
Edinburgh City Mission was founded on 1 March 1832 by David Nasmith, six years after the founding of the first City Mission in the world, Glasgow City Mission.

The Mission has formerly been active in various forms of outreach, including street evangelism, setting up special events, and was known for its work in the poorer, deprived areas of the city through Mission Halls and Drop-In Centres.

The Mission also used to run Christian Heritage Edinburgh and hosted Celtic Tours on the Royal Mile. Christian Heritage Edinburgh became an independent charity in its own right a few years ago.

External links
 Official website

Churches in Edinburgh
City and Gospel Rescue Missions
Organizations established in 1832
1832 establishments in Scotland
Charities based in Edinburgh
Christian charities based in Scotland
Homelessness in Scotland
Poverty in Scotland